Extortion, is a 2017 American thriller film, starring Eion Bailey, Bethany Joy Lenz, Barkhad Abdi, and Danny Glover.

Synopsis
Kevin Riley and his family get stuck on a deserted island. A fisherman named Miguel Kabo finds them and asks for one million dollar in exchange for the survival of his family. Riley says he doesn't have that amount of money, so Kabo captures Riley and forces him to try to get the one million dollars however he can.

Riley is able to get the money by calling in favours from some of his friends, but when Kabo is taking him back to the island, he traps Riley in a cabin and sinks the boat before catching a lift with an accomplice. Riley is able to escape and is rescued by a passing tourist ship, but is unable to convince the local police of his story, as he cannot provide verifiable names and the evidence could equally suggest that he paid someone off to help him get rid of his wife and son. Recalling a distinctive wound on Kabo’s arm after seeing someone with a similar scar, Riley is able to find the doctor who treated the injury and convince her to help him find Kabo. Unfortunately, when he finds Kabo’s house and boat details, the situation escalates into a stand-off where Riley tries to take Kabo’s child hostage and the child is killed with a harpoon gun, forcing Riley to slit Kabo’s throat in self-defence.

Riley is taken into custody in the hospital, with Constable Haagen now certain that his story of his lost family was faked, but Riley is able to escape. While his own investigative efforts failed, Riley finds Kabo’s accomplice on a bus by chance, but although the other man is hit by a truck, he remains conscious long enough to indicate the island where Kabo abandoned his family. Running to a nearby marina, Riley is able to steal a boat and get back to the island, where he finds his wife and son still alive, albeit weak. He gets his son back to the boat, but it drifts off while he is trying to get his wife to safety, and he collapses from his injuries. However, a police helicopter pursuing his stolen boat comes into land and his eyes open, suggesting that Riley’s family will survive.

Cast
Eion Bailey as Kevin Riley
Bethany Joy Lenz as Julie Riley
Barkhad Abdi as Miguel Kaba
Danny Glover as Constable Haagen 
Mauricio Alemañy as Andy Riley
Tim Griffin as Chief of Mission Sweeney

See also
Extortion

References

External links

 

2017 films
2017 thriller films
American thriller films
Films set in the Caribbean
2010s English-language films
2010s American films